This was the first edition.

Anke Huber won in the final 6–4, 7–6(7–2) against Helena Suková.

Seeds
A champion seed is indicated in bold text while text in italics indicates the round in which that seed was eliminated.

  Iva Majoli (quarterfinals)
  Anke Huber (champion)
  Magdalena Maleeva (first round)
  Brenda Schultz-McCarthy (second round)
  Judith Wiesner (semifinals)
  Sabine Appelmans (second round)
  Elena Likhovtseva (second round)
  Helena Suková (final)

Draw

References

 1996 Wilkinson Championships Draw

Women's Singles
Singles